Kovaithambi (born 28 November 1940) is an Indian film producer and politician who was active primarily in the 1980s, in Tamil cinema.

Early life 
Kovaithambi was born on 28 November 1940 to Perumal Udayar and Sunthayi Ammal, a farming couple belonging to the Udayar caste. He did his schooling at the R. S. Puram Corporation Boys Higher Secondary School, Coimbatore. During that period, he was fascinated by the speeches of politicians such as M. G. Ramachandran, C. N. Annadurai, M. Karunanidhi, E. V. K. Sampath, V. R. Nedunchezhiyan, Nanjil K. Manoharan and K. Anbazhagan. He also wrote and starred in many school plays.

Career

Politics 
Kovaithambi joined the All India Anna Dravida Munnetra Kazhagam (AIADMK) when it was formed by M. G. Ramachandran. Between 1977 and 1986, Kovaithambi served as the AIADMK's Coimbatore District Secretary. From 1980 to 1984, he served as the Perur constituency MLA. Kovaithambi left the AIADMK in 1988, following the death of Ramachandran in 1987. As of 2009, Kovaithambi was the state executive president of the Tamil Nadu Parkava Kula Sangam (TNPKS), an "umbrella body for the Udayar, Moopanar and Nainar communities".

Cinema 
In 1981, Kovaithambi established Motherland Pictures, and the first film produced by this company was R. Sundarrajan's directorial debut Payanangal Mudivathillai (1982), which became a silver jubilee hit; Kovaithambi was credited for the film's story. He went on to produce more commercially successful films in the 1980s including Ilamai Kaalangal (1983), Idaya Kovil (1985), and Udaya Geetham (1985). After Chembaruthi (1992), Kovaithambi took a sabbatical from producing. In 2008, he attempted a comeback with Yen Ippadi Mayakinay, which ultimately never released; Kovaithambi's comeback film instead became Uyirukku Uyiraga (2014).

Personal life 
Kovaithambi is married to Sita. Both are founders of Motherland Matriculation Higher Secondary School.

Filmography

References

External links 
 

1940 births
Indian film producers
Living people
Tamil film producers
Tamil Nadu politicians